Fiona Eileen Flanagan (born September 13, 1961), known professionally as Fiona, is an American rock singer and actress, best known as the love interest in the 1987 Bob Dylan vehicle Hearts of Fire.

Career
Fiona was born on September 13, 1961 in Phillipsburg, New Jersey after her parents moved from Dublin, Ireland to the U.S.

At the age of 18, she moved to New York City, where she began her career as a singer in several bands. In the mid-1980s, she was signed to Atlantic Records. Her self-titled debut studio album was released in 1985. The album peaked at No. 71 on that year's Billboard 200 chart and remained charted for a week. The album's sole single, "Talk to Me", reached No. 12 and No. 64 on Billboards Hot Mainstream Rock Tracks and Hot 100 charts respectively. That same year, she also guested on Aldo Nova's third studio album, Twitch. Around this time, Fiona made her acting debut in the Miami Vice second season episode "Little Miss Dangerous", first aired on January 31, 1986.

Her second studio album, Beyond the Pale, was released in 1986. That album spawned two singles: "Hopelessly Love You" and "Living in a Boy's World".  In 1987, Fiona starred opposite Bob Dylan in the musical drama Hearts of Fire. Fiona sings the film's title-track which appears on the film's soundtrack, along with four previously unreleased songs by Fiona. Her third studio album, Heart Like a Gun, was released in 1989. That album also yielded two singles, "Where the Cowboys Go" and "Everything You Do (You're Sexing Me)", a duet with Kip Winger. She has since released two subsequent studio albums, 1992's Squeeze and 2011's Unbroken.

In addition to her own solo work, Fiona has also performed backing vocals for other artists including Warrant (on the Cherry Pie album).

Personal life
Fiona was once married to record producer Beau Hill, who produced, played some instruments on and sang backing vocals on some of her studio albums. She was also in a relationship with guitarist Reb Beach of Winger who likewise performed on her second studio album Beyond the Pale (1986).

Since taking a break from music, Fiona has married for a second time and graduated from UCLA. She briefly worked for PricewaterhouseCoopers but resigned to have two children, daughter Owen and son Aidan.

Discography

Studio albums
Fiona (1985)
Beyond the Pale (1986)
Heart Like a Gun (1989)
Squeeze (1992)
Unbroken (2011)

Compilation albums
Greatest Hits (2009)

Singles

References

External links
 
 
 
 

1961 births
Living people
20th-century American actresses
21st-century American women singers
Actresses from New Jersey
Atlantic Records artists
American women pop singers
American women rock singers
American women singer-songwriters
American film actresses
American people of Irish descent
American television actresses
Geffen Records artists
People from Phillipsburg, New Jersey
Singer-songwriters from New Jersey
University of California, Los Angeles alumni
21st-century American singers